Aleksandr Vasilyevich Salnov (born 8 May 1946) is a Russian professional football coach and a former player. In early 2008 he managed FC SOYUZ-Gazprom Izhevsk, but due to lack of proper license was not officially registered as the head coach.

Salnov played in the Soviet First League with FC Zenit Izhevsk.

External links
Profile at Footballfacts.ru

1946 births
Living people
Soviet footballers
Russian football managers
Association football midfielders
FC Izhevsk players